The São Paulo Metro, commonly called the Metrô is one of the urban railways that serves the city of São Paulo, alongside the São Paulo Metropolitan Trains Company (CPTM), forming the largest metropolitan rail transport network of Latin America. The metro system carries about 5,300,000 passengers a day.

Metro itself is far from covering the entire urban area in the city of São Paulo and only runs within the city limits. However, it is complemented by a network of metropolitan trains operated by CPTM and Via Mobilidade, which serve the São Paulo and the São Paulo Metropolitan Region. The metropolitan trains differs from Metro because it also serves other municipalities around São Paulo with larger average distance between stations and freight trains operating in some lines (except for the Line 9, which has almost no differences to the Metro lines).

Considered the most modern in Latin America, the system is the first to install platform screen doors at a station, and use communications-based train control with lines 4 and 15 being fully automated. 
Line 15, is a monorail line that partially opened for service in 2014 and is the first high capacity monorail line of Latin America. The São Paulo Metro and CPTM both operate as State-owned companies, and have received awards in the recent past as one of the cleanest systems in the world by ISO9001. The São Paulo Metro was voted Best Metro Americas at the MetroRail 2010 industry conference and it was chosen as one of the best metro systems of the world by Business Insider, being the only system in Latin America to make the list.

History

The Companhia do Metropolitano de São Paulo (Metrô) was founded on April 24, 1968. Eight months later, work on north–south line was initiated. In 1972, the first test train trip occurred between Jabaquara and Saúde stations. On September 14, 1974, the segment between Jabaquara and Vila Mariana entered into commercial operation.

The first line, Norte/Sul (North/South), later renamed "Blue Line" or Line 1 - Blue, was opened on September 18, 1972, with an experimental operation between Saúde and Jabaquara stations. Commercial operations started on September 14, 1974, after an eight-year "gestation" period that began in 1966, under Mayor Faria Lima's administration. Expansion of the metro system includes new lines. As of late 2004, construction began on a US$1 billion,  all-underground line (Line 4 - Yellow), with eleven stations, aimed at transporting almost one million people per day. By 2004, Line 2 was also being expanded, with two new stations open in 2006 and another one in 2007.

A  expansion of Line 5 was completed in 2018.

, tickets cost R$4.40. In 2006, the São Paulo Metro system has started to use a smart card, called "Bilhete Único" (or "Single Ticket" in English).

Current operational data

The metro system consists of six color-coded lines: Line 1 (Blue), Line 2 (Green), Line 3 (Red), Line 4 (Yellow), Line 5 (Lilac) and Line 15 (Silver), operating from Sunday to Saturday, from 4:40 AM to midnight (1:00 AM on Saturdays). Line 15 (Silver), is a high-capacity monorail.

The six lines achieved an average weekday ridership of 5.3 million in 2019. On 14 September 2019, Metrô  recorded the highest ever ridership figure of 5.5 million on a single business day, caused by the recent expansion of some lines. The Metro provided 1,4945  billion rides over the course of 2019.

Bus terminals
In May 1977, Metro assumed the administration and commercial utilization of the Inter-City Jabaquara Intermunicipal Terminal, and inaugurated, in May 1982, the modern Inter-city Tietê Bus Terminal, replacing the former Júlio Prestes Terminal.

This agreement established that Metro would be in charge of the studies for the planning, implementation, and operation of passenger transportation in the municipal district of São Paulo, either directly or through third parties.

Later, the other inter-city bus terminals were integrated into the system, such as Bresser, in January 1988, and Palmeiras-Barra Funda, in December 1989. In January 1990 the inter-city bus terminals were outsourced by Metrô, which through public bidding, contracted Consortium Prima for the administration and commercial utilization of the 4 inter-city bus terminals of the city of São Paulo. This contract included the responsibility for maintenance and conservation of the existing installations, as well as of the expansion and modernisation of the terminals.

Rolling stock

The first cars started operating in 1974, the same year the company's commercial activities were initiated. This model was named Series 100, whose cars received the numbers of 1001 to 1306 (51 trains of 6 cars each). They were designed in United States by the Budd Company, and the national rolling stock manufacturer Mafersa did the final assembly. The model was based on the Class A trains from the Bay Area Rapid Transit system, even using the same Westinghouse 1460 series chopper traction controls, and was to be used along the north–south line, now known as Line 1 - Blue. The initially they operated with two car trains with cars added as demand increased, up to a maximum of six cars. All of them have a pair of electric motors and a cab.

Today, this stock is known as "A stock". The entire "A stock" was planned to be phased out by the beginning of 2015, as the recent modernization processes saw them being converted into two different stocks: I and J. The last A stock train was withdrawn from service in February 2018.

To reduce the manufacturing costs, the Cobrasma company decided to provide, for the East-West Line, now Line 3. Trains had cabs only and made use of more advanced ventilation and maintenance systems. This stock was known by the name of "C". The batch of trains designed for this line were produced by two different national companies, Cobrasma and Mafersa (whose trains got named as "D"). The trains entered service between 1984 and 1986 on Line 3 and remained there for their entire service lives, although in their final years, some of the D stock trains were transferred to Line 1 where they ran with the older A stock trains.

The only difference between the two is the front mask and some structural framework. Their original technical nomenclature was 300. According to it, the C stock was numbered from 301 (C01) to 325 (C25), and the D stock had trains numbered from 326 (D26) to 347 (D47). The C stock trains were already refurbished as K stock and the D stock was refurbished and created the L cars. The refurbishment program for the entire stock of A, C and D trains was completed in 2018.

Today the rolling stock of the São Paulo Metro consists of 11 stocks, 232 trains and 1,419 cars and it is divided as follows:

E stock: Built by Alstom and entered service between 1998 and 1999. They currently operate on Line 1 - Blue.
F stock: Alstom trains specially built for Line 5 - Lilac between 2001 and 2002.
G stock: Also built by Alstom and entered service in 2008. They currently run on Lines 1 - Blue and 3 - Red.
H stock: Streamlined CAF-built trains built in 2010 which operate exclusively on Line 3 - Red since 2014.
I and J stock: Refurbished A stock trains which operate on Lines 1 - Blue and 2 - Green from 2011. They differ cosmetically as well as mechanically. I stock was rebuilt by Alstom and Siemens while J stock was rebuilt by Bombardier, Temoinsa, BTT and Tejofran.
K stock: Refurbished C stock trains rebuilt by a consortium consisting of T’trans, MTTrens, MPE and Temoinsa. They operate on Line 3 - Red just like the original trains.
L stock: D stock refurbished by Alstom and IESA and operates on Line 1 - Blue
M stock: The Monorail stock built by Bombardier between 2013 and 2016 and operates on Line 15 - Silver.
P stock: CAF-built trains from 2013 which run on Line 5 - Lilac alongside the former F stock.
400 series: Driverless trains built in 2009-2010 and 2016-2017 by Hyundai Rotem for Line 4 - Yellow

Security
Metro's security agents have police powers and in case of need they will provide assistance. All police matters that occur within the system are directed to the police station of the subway system, Delegacia de Polícia do Metropolitano de São Paulo (DELPOM), located at Palmeiras-Barra Funda station.

System lines

Future developments
Several conventional metro and monorail lines are currently under construction or under project.

Network Map

See also 
 List of São Paulo Metro stations
 Companhia do Metropolitano de São Paulo - São Paulo Metropolitan Company
 Companhia Paulista de Trens Metropolitanos - São Paulo Metropolitan Trains' Company
 Trens Intercidades - planned regional rail network centred on São Paulo
 Transport in São Paulo
 List of Latin American rail transit systems by ridership
 List of metro systems
 List of monorail systems
 List of São Paulo Metro yards
 Rapid transit in Brazil

References

External links

 São Paulo Metro website
 Essential Network of São Paulo Metro (project of extension of the network to be ready by 2025)  
 CityMayors article

 
Rapid transit in Brazil
Electric railways in Brazil
Underground rapid transit in Brazil
Metro